El Líbano is a subdivision of a district in Chame District, Panamá Oeste Province, Panama with a population of 200 as of 2010. Its population as of 1990 was 177; its population as of 2000 was 191.

References

Corregimientos of Panamá Oeste Province